Hungary is in the Central European Time (CET) zone, which is one hour ahead of Coordinated Universal Time (UTC).  Hungary observes Daylight Saving Time (DST).

Daylight saving time 
Daylight saving time was introduced in Hungary first in 1916 and it was observed until 1919. After that DST was in use between 1941–1949 and 1954-1957. DST has been in use again since 1980.

Notation 

The 24-hour clock is used in formal or informal settings and the 12-hour clock is used largely in informal settings. The time format is "hh óra mm perc", but the numeric form hh.mm or hh:mm can also be used. Example:
10.35 or 10:35

IANA time zone database
The IANA time zone database contains one zone for Hungary in the file zone.tab, which is named Europe/Budapest.

References